Colleen Wing is a fictional character appearing in American comic books published by Marvel Comics.

Descended from a family of samurai, Wing is a Japanese martial artist who avenged her grandfather's death with the help of the superhero Iron Fist. After arriving in New York City, Wing befriended former police officer Misty Knight with whom she started a private investigation agency. The two would later form the crime fighting duo, the Daughters of the Dragon. As private investigators, Wing and Knight frequently work with the Heroes for Hire duo Luke Cage and Iron Fist. In the 2010 Daredevil storyline "Shadowland", Wing becomes the leader of The Nail, a splinter group of The Hand ninja clan.

Jessica Henwick portrayed the character in the Netflix television series Iron Fist (2017–2018), The Defenders (2017), and the 2018 second season of Luke Cage, set in the Marvel Cinematic Universe (MCU).

Publication history
Colleen Wing first appeared in Marvel Premiere #19 (November 1974), created by writer Doug Moench and artist Larry Hama.

Fictional character biography
Colleen was born in the mountains of Honshu, Japan, to Professor Lee Wing (a teacher of Asian history at Columbia University) and a mother whose ancestors were samurai and daimyōs. After her mother's death, Colleen's late maternal grandfather Kenji Ozawa taught her the ways of the samurai, in which she later became very skilled. Professor Wing learned from a monk that young warrior Iron Fist would come from that land to seek vengeance on his father's killer and sent Colleen to meet him. Professor Wing and Colleen befriended Iron Fist, and Colleen has acted as his ally in many of his exploits. In Colleen's first appearance, she met Iron Fist, and she then aided Iron Fist in battling the Cult of Kara-Kai. Years later, Colleen went back to New York City to visit her father there. Upon arrival, she got caught in a gun battle by the local Manhattan police and some thugs. Luckily, she was rescued by officer Misty Knight, who eventually became her best friend. Later, when Knight's right arm was severely injured by a bomb explosion and was amputated, Colleen encouraged Knight to rise above her depression and return to an active role in life. Colleen and Knight formed a partnership as private investigators and called their firm Nightwing Restorations, Ltd. Due to Wing's samurai-style training and both partners' expertise in the Asian martial arts, they were dubbed "the Daughters of the Dragon."

Colleen was at one point captured by Master Khan and Angar the Screamer, who turned her into a mesmerized slave. Colleen battled Iron Fist, who finally freed her from their mental control. Colleen then teamed with Misty in opposing agents of the criminal Emil Vachon in Hong Kong. Colleen was captured by Emil Vachon, however, who turned her into a heroin addict. She was rescued by Misty Knight, overcame her addiction, and took vengeance on Vahcon. Colleen then fought Davos, the second Steel Serpent, and met Spider-Man.

Colleen later aided the X-Men and Sunfire in battling Moses Magnum in Japan. She accompanied the X-Men to Canada, and made romantic overtures towards Cyclops, whose girlfriend Jean Grey was presumed to be dead at the time. She was held prisoner by Arcade soon after that.

Colleen later met the actor Bob Diamond, one of the Sons of the Tiger. She then battled Constrictor and Sabretooth. Professor Wing then regained his memory, and Colleen's training in samurai skills by her grandfather was revealed. Colleen then began a romance with Bob Diamond. She was shot by Warhawk, and later fought the Constrictor again. She was briefly turned to glass by the second Chemistro, and was soon returned to normal. She then fought Fera (now Ferocia). Colleen later temporarily ended her friendship with Misty due to the latter's romance with Tyrone King. Colleen was next transported to K'un-L'un. She killed Chiantang the mystic dragon. She then attended the funeral of an impostor she believed to be Danny Rand.

Some time later, Colleen saw a second Danny Rand impostor on television. She confronted this impostor, who was actually the Super-Skrull. She was present at the exhumation of the corpse of the first Danny Rand impostor.

After her relationship with Bob Diamond ended, Colleen once again started up the Daughters of the Dragon organization with Misty as bondswoman.

Succeeding in that during the 2006 "Civil War" storyline, she and Misty create the new Heroes for Hire due to the urging of Iron Man, Reed Richards and Spider-Man.

Colleen has been identified as one of the 142 registered superheroes who have registered as part of the Initiative. In the group's most recent mission, Colleen Wing and Tarantula were offered to the Brood Queen by their possessed teammate Humbug When Shang-Chi and the other heroes come save them, Colleen is in traumatic shock; she is further agitated when Moon-Boy, whom the group had been hired to apprehend for S.H.I.E.L.D. is taken into custody by Paladin. Misty had made a deal with him in order to find both her and Tarantula after their capture. Colleen, deeply upset by this, left the group as a result. Heroes for Hire disbanded in the aftermath of this.

Following Daredevil's takeover of Hell's Kitchen during the "Shadowland" storyline, Misty, Colleen Wing, Iron Fist, Luke Cage, and Shang-Chi confront him in attempt to stop him without violence. After a commotion happens elsewhere in his castle, he attacks the group, believing they are responsible. Days after the fight, Colleen is contacted by Daredevil, offering information about her mother. Upon visiting him again, he reveals to her that her mother actually led a resurrected Hand group of all swordswomen called "the Nail". Colleen's mother and the Nail were eventually assassinated by one of The Hand's enemies. Daredevil then asks her to lead a new incarnation of the group. She eventually accepts and meets the Nail consisting of Black Lotus, Cherry Blossom, Makro, and Yuki. Colleen later betrays the Nail and has to defend herself against them.

Powers and abilities
Colleen Wing was an athletic woman with no superhuman abilities. She has achieved mastery of the traditional combat skills of the Japanese samurai, including swordsmanship (Kenjutsu); she is a talented swordswoman and has been shown defeating several HYDRA agents with no injury. She is also highly-skilled in other martial arts such as Judo, Karate, and Iaidō.

After being brainwashed as a living weapon by Iron Fist foe Master Khan, Danny melds his mind with hers in order to break her free of this control. As a result, Colleen gains knowledge of K'un L'un martial arts as well as chi control; allowing her to focus her chi to enhance her strength, accelerate her healing, and reduce her body functions to survive severe conditions.

She wields a 1,000-year-old katana which she inherited from her grandfather. Colleen is also a seasoned private detective with excellent investigative skills.

Other versions
 Colleen appears briefly in the alternate timeline of the 1995–1996 "Age of Apocalypse" storyline. She and Misty Knight were in the same human pens and escaped together. However, Colleen was infested by a Brood-infested Christopher Summers and later killed by Misty Knight.
 An Ultimate Marvel version of Colleen Wing appears in Ultimate Spider-Man #110 as the wife of Danny Rand.
 Colleen appears in the alternate timeline of the 2005 "House of M" storyline as a member of the Dragons, in which the leader is Shang-Chi. Later, she was among the captured Dragons in a trap arranged by both the Kingpin and the Brotherhood. They were freed by Luke Cage in order to help the Avengers defeat the Brotherhood.
 In A.I.M.'s pocket dimension of Earth-13584, Colleen Wing appears as a member of Spider-Man's gang.

In other media

Television

Colleen Wing appears in Marvel's Netflix television series, portrayed by Jessica Henwick:
 First appearing in the first season of Iron Fist, this version runs a dojo in Chinatown, teaching self-defense lessons to disadvantaged youths. She meets Danny Rand, who initially challenges her before she gradually warms up to him when Ward Meachum attempts to bribe her. After convincing her to join him in his fight against the Hand by buying her building, becoming her landlord, and remitting her rent, Wing works with Rand to dismantle the Hand's operations and they gradually fall in love with each other, both unaware that her sensei Bakuto is a founding member of the Hand who used her dojo to find recruits. When Rand discovers this, he and Wing briefly part ways, though they quickly reconcile after Bakuto tries to have her killed by her own students. Wing and Rand later defeat Harold Meachum and travel to K'un-L'un, only to find the entrance closed and littered with the corposes of Hand ninjas.
 As of the miniseries The Defenders, Wing and Rand began traveling the world to find members of the Hand until they are attacked by Elektra Natchios and, following a dying Chaste member's last words, return to New York, where Rand battles Luke Cage until Wing and Claire Temple help the pair work out their differences. While Rand joins forces with Cage, Matt Murdock, and Jessica Jones to battle the Hand, Wing works with Temple and Misty Knight to protect their loved ones from Bakuto.
 Wing returns in the Luke Cage episode "Wig Out", in which she reunites with Knight and trains her to fight with one arm following the events of The Defenders.
 Wing returns in the second season of Iron Fist, in which she and Rand battle his brother Davos while she investigates the history of a brush and comb set marked with the symbol on her katana. By the end of the season, Rand passes the mantle of the Iron Fist to Wing upon discovering she is the descendant of Wu Ao-Shi, the first woman to defeat Shou-Lao.

Video games
 Colleen Wing appears in Iron Fist's ending for Ultimate Marvel vs. Capcom 3 as a member of his new Heroes for Hire.
 Colleen Wing appears as an assist character in Marvel Heroes. This version is a member of the Heroes for Hire.
 Colleen Wing appears as an unlockable playable character in Marvel Avengers Alliance.
 Colleen Wing appears as an unlockable playable character in Lego Marvel Super Heroes 2.

References

External links

 
 Colleen Wing at Marvel Directory.com
 Daughters of the Dragon at Women of Marvel Comics

Asian-American superheroes
Characters created by Doug Moench
Characters created by Larry Hama
Chinese superheroes
Comics characters introduced in 1974
Fictional female martial artists
Fictional female ninja
Fictional kenjutsuka
Fictional New York City Police Department detectives
Fictional samurai
Fictional swordfighters in comics
Fictional women soldiers and warriors
Iron Fist (comics)
Japanese superheroes
Luke Cage
Marvel Comics female superheroes
Marvel Comics martial artists
Marvel Comics sidekicks